The thirteenth season of Criminal Minds was ordered on April 7, 2017, by CBS with an order of 22 episodes. The season premiered on September 27, 2017 in a new time slot at 10:00PM on Wednesday when it had previously been at 9:00PM on Wednesday since its inception. The season concluded on April 18, 2018.

Cast 
The entire main cast from the previous season returned for the season, except Damon Gupton (Stephen Walker), who was written out of the show. His character was killed off in the season premiere off-screen. 

Following the cancellation of Criminal Minds: Beyond Borders, it was announced that Daniel Henney (Matt Simmons) would join the cast this season as a series regular.

Main cast 

 Joe Mantegna as Supervisory Special Agent David Rossi (BAU Senior Agent)
 Matthew Gray Gubler as Supervisory Special Agent Dr. Spencer Reid (BAU Agent)
 A. J. Cook as Supervisory Special Agent Jennifer "JJ" Jareau (BAU Agent)
 Kirsten Vangsness as Special Agent Penelope Garcia (BAU Technical Analyst & Co-Communications Liaison)
 Aisha Tyler as Supervisory Special Agent Dr. Tara Lewis (BAU Agent)
 Daniel Henney as Supervisory Special Agent Matt Simmons (BAU Agent)
 Adam Rodriguez as Supervisory Special Agent Luke Alvez (BAU Agent)
 Paget Brewster as Supervisory Special Agent Emily Prentiss (BAU Unit Chief & Co-Communications Liaison)

Special guest star 
 Shemar Moore as Derek Morgan, Former FBI BAU Agent

Recurring cast
 Josh Stewart as William LaMontagne Jr.
 Kelly Frye as Kristy Simmons
 Declan Whaley as David Simmons
 Kim Rhodes as FBI Assistant Director Linda Barnes

Guest cast
 Bodhi Elfman as Peter Lewis / Mr. Scratch
 Tracie Thoms as Monica Walker
 Jamie Kennedy as Floyd Feylinn Ferell
 Corey Reynolds as Phil Brooks
 Zelda Williams as Melissa Miller
 Lou Diamond Phillips as Sheriff Clifford
 Daniella Alonso as Lisa Douglas
 Gail O'Grady as Krystall Richards
 Danielle C. Ryan as Portia Richards
 Sebastian Sozzi as Carlos Garcia
 James Urbaniak as FBI Special Agent Owen Quinn
 Karen David as FBI Special Agent Mary Meadows
 Michael Hogan as Benjamin David Merva

Production

Development
Criminal Minds was renewed for a thirteenth season with an episode order of 22 episodes on April 7, 2017. The entire main cast from the previous season returned for the season, except Damon Gupton (Stephen Walker), who was fired from the show.

Matthew Gray Gubler directed the seventeenth episode of the season and it was said to be "the spookiest episode of Season 13" and involved clowns. On August 10, 2017, it was revealed that Aisha Tyler will make her television directing debut and direct the sixth episode of the season. On August 12, 2017 it was revealed that Erica Messer and Kirsten Vangsness will be co-writing the eleventh episode of the season, which will be the fourth episode they have co-written together. On October 31, 2017, it was announced that Adam Rodriguez will make his Criminal Minds directing debut and direct the sixteenth episode of the season.

Casting

On June 11, 2017, it was announced that Damon Gupton had been let go from the show after one season. CBS said his departure was "part of a creative change on the show".  

On June 20, 2017, CBS announced that Daniel Henney, who was a series regular on Criminal Minds: Beyond Borders as Matt Simmons,  would join the main show as a series regular for the thirteenth season.

On October 12, 2017, it was announced that Shemar Moore would reprise his role as Derek Morgan in the fifth episode of the season ("Lucky Strikes"). His character returned to help Penelope Garcia get through a tough time.

Episodes

Ratings

Home media

References

External links
 

Criminal Minds
2017 American television seasons
2018 American television seasons
Television series about cults